The 1991 Western Michigan Broncos football team represented Western Michigan University in the Mid-American Conference (MAC) during the 1991 NCAA Division I-A football season.  In their fifth season under head coach Al Molde, the Broncos compiled a 6–5 record (4–4 against MAC opponents), finished in fifth place in the MAC, and were outscored by their opponents, 253 to 218.  The team played its home games at Waldo Stadium in Kalamazoo, Michigan.

The team's statistical leaders included Brad Tayles with 1,949 passing yards, Corey Sylve with 711 rushing yards, and John Morton with 588 receiving yards.

Schedule

References

Western Michigan
Western Michigan Broncos football seasons
Western Michigan Broncos football